Jumanji is an American media franchise, based on the children's books Jumanji (1981) and its sequel Zathura (2002), written by Chris Van Allsburg. The first film was produced by TriStar Pictures, and subsequent films by Columbia Pictures, both subsidiaries of Sony Pictures. The franchise follows the adventures of various people who find themselves imperiled when playing an enchanted game that comes with a variety of dangerous jungle elements that the players must survive as they play. Ultimately, the only way to end the disruptions is to finish the game while enduring its dangers.

The franchise includes four films: Jumanji (1995), Zathura: A Space Adventure (2005), Jumanji: Welcome to the Jungle (2017), and Jumanji: The Next Level (2019); and an animated television series which aired from 1996 to 1999. The first film received mixed reviews from critics, while the three follow-up films received positive critical response. The films have grossed $2 billion collectively at the global box office.

Origin

Jumanji (1981)
Two children, Peter and Judy, find and play a game in which each roll of the dice brings the jungle from the game (as well as the creatures that live in it) to life around them. In order to reset the world around them, they must finish the game and make it to the titular city of gold. Afterward, they get rid of the game which is found by their next-door neighbors, two young brothers.

Zathura (2002)
Brothers Danny and Walter, neighbors of Peter and Judy from the previous book, find Jumanji but ultimately choose not to play it. Instead, they find a similar game on the same board with a space theme, Zathura, which they begin to play. As with Jumanji, playing Zathura brings elements of the game into reality, and in order to set everything back to normal, the boys must complete the game.

Films

Jumanji (1995)

Two children find and play a magical board game. In doing so, they release a man trapped for decades in its inner dimension and a host of dangers from the jungle that can only be stopped by finishing the game.

Zathura: A Space Adventure (2005)

Two young brothers are drawn into an intergalactic adventure when their house is hurled through the depths of space by the magical board game they are playing. Furthermore, the brothers surmise the only way to return home is to finish the game.

Though there are no direct references to Jumanji in Zathura: A Space Adventure and the movie's plot is self-contained, the studio marketed it as being set within the same fictional universe, and is thematically similar to the other franchise installments. The film is based on the children's book Zathura, also written by Van Allsburg, which was a sequel to the Jumanji novel. Despite the film's placement within the same fictional universe, director Jon Favreau discouraged the notion that the film is a sequel, having not particularly liked Jumanji.

Jumanji: Welcome to the Jungle (2017)

Twenty-two years after the events of the original film, the board game has magically become a video game. Four high school teenagers are transported to the game's jungle setting and become the avatars of the characters they chose, and later discover another victim trapped in the game as well. The only way out is to complete the game and in doing so, they each discover the best of themselves and win with a newfound heroism to see the challenge through. The film served as a direct sequel to the 1995 film.

Jumanji: The Next Level (2019)

The team of friends return to Jumanji to rescue one of their own but discover that nothing is as they expect. The players need to brave parts unknown, from arid deserts to snowy mountains, in order to escape the world's most dangerous game.

Untitled Jumanji: The Next Level sequel 
In December 2019, Dwayne Johnson revealed that the next installment in the franchise would reveal that the villain from The Next Level, Jurgen the Brutal, was an avatar in the game and that the identity of who was playing as the character would be explored. 
In March 2020, Jake Kasdan confirmed early developments for a follow-up film. Kasdan confirmed plans to maintain the core cast of the previous two films. The following month, the filmmaker stated that the story for the next installment is in development. In October 2022, producer Hiram Garcia stated that Kasdan will begin production on the next Jumanji movie, following the completing his directorial responsibilities on Red One.

Television

Jumanji (1996-1999)

Jumanji was an animated television series inspired by the 1995 film which ran for three seasons from 1996 to 1999.

Main cast and characters

Additional crew and production details

Reception

Box office performance

Critical and public response

Video games
 Jumanji: A Jungle Adventure Game Pack (1996)
Jumanji: A Jungle Adventure is a video game released exclusively in North America for Microsoft Windows on October 9, 1996. It was developed by Studio Interactive and published by Philips Interactive Media. It contains five different action-arcade-based minigames that are based on popular scenes from the film.

 Zathura (2005)
Zathura is an action-adventure video game developed by High Voltage Software and published by 2K Games. It was released on November 3, 2005 for PlayStation 2 and Xbox.

 Jumanji (2006)
Jumanji is a party video game released exclusively in Europe for the PlayStation 2 on 2006, developed by Atomic Planet Entertainment and published by Blast! Entertainment.

 Jumanji (2007)
Fujishoji released a Pachinko game in 2007, using clips from the film and also 3D rendered CGI anime character designs for the game as part of the screen interaction.

 Jumanji: The Mobile Game (2017)
Jumanji: The Mobile Game was a mobile game based on the 2017 film Jumanji: Welcome to the Jungle developed by Idiocracy Games and published by NHN Entertainment, and released for Android and iOS on December 14, 2017. The game was removed from Google Play and App Store on May 2, 2018, and its service ended on May 24.

 Jumanji: The VR Adventure (2018)
Jumanji: The VR Adventure was a virtual reality experience based on the 2017 film Jumanji: Welcome to the Jungle. Developed by MWM Immersive and published by Sony Pictures Virtual Reality, it was released on Steam for HTC Vive on January 17, 2018. Although it was announced that the experience would be released on Oculus Rift and PlayStation VR, the releases were canceled, as the game was heavily criticized for its poor graphics and hardware performance. It was delisted from Steam on February 9, 2018.

 Jumanji: The Video Game (2019)
Jumanji: The Video Game is an action-adventure video game developed by Funsolve and published by Outright Games. Based on Jumanji: Welcome to the Jungle and Jumanji: The Next Level, it was released on November 8, 2019 for PlayStation 4, Xbox One, Nintendo Switch, and Microsoft Windows.

Notes

References

Film series introduced in 1995
Mass media franchises introduced in 1995
Sony Pictures franchises
 
Films about curses